Saint-Santin (Languedocien: Sent Antin), or Saint-Santin d'Aveyron, is a commune in the Aveyron department in southern France.

Since the French revolution, the town of Saint-Santin has been split in two communes in two different departments, Saint-Santin d'Aveyron and Saint-Santin-de-Maurs in the department of Cantal.

Population

See also
Communes of the Aveyron department

References

Communes of Aveyron
Aveyron communes articles needing translation from French Wikipedia